Ryan Fante (born 24 February 1986) is a Canadian professional soccer player who plays for Mongolian Premier League club Deren FC.

Career

Singapore

Spending his early career in Canada where he played in the Ontario Soccer League, and Canadian Soccer League, Fante sealed a move to Singaporean outfit Sengkang Punggol in 2010. The Canadian then recorded his first start in a 1–0 defeat to Albirex Niigata S and registered his first goal in a 1–1 tie with Beijing Guoan Singapore. Deployed as a winger or second striker, Fante often outdistanced opponents but failed to score on numerous occasions. Because of this, the forward was demoted to Sengkang Punggol's Prime League squad but there too he was unable to score goals in abundance. By mid-season 2010, the club decided to release Fante due to his goalscoring ineptitude.

Australia and Mongolia

Around a year after his release from Sengkang Punggol, Fante transferred to Australian semi-pro club Valentine Phoenix FC with Canadians Adrian Butters and Shondell Busby. In spite of saying that the standard was not as high as in Singapore, he stayed there for a few months before going to Mongolia to play for Khoromkhon FC in June 2012.

Honours

Individual

OSL Provincial East Rookie of the Year- 2007
OSL Central Region East Leading Goal Scorer- 2006
Hearts Azzurri U18 League Ontario Cp and National Champions- 2004
Pine Ridge S.S. Sr. Boys Soccer MVP-2003/04
Sporting Lisbon Training-2001
Sporting Toronto League Leading Goal Scorer-1999
Stadium Newspaper Portuguese Cup MVP-1998

References

1986 births
Living people
Expatriate footballers in Singapore
Association football forwards
Canadian soccer players
Singapore Premier League players
Soccer players from Toronto
Canadian expatriate soccer players
York Region Shooters players
Hougang United FC players
Valentine Phoenix FC players
Khoromkhon players
Canadian Soccer League (1998–present) players
Mongolian National Premier League players
Deren FC players
Ulaanbaataryn Unaganuud FC players